This article lists political parties in Iran.

Parties active inside Iran

Principlists

Main active parties

Other parties

Reformists 

Main active parties

Other parties

Banned parties

Outlawed parties tolerated inside Iran

Opposition parties active in exile

Monarchists/Liberal-Conservative
All monarchist organizations are secular and support restoring the Pahlavi dynasty:

Ethnic

Leftists

Others

See also
Politics of Iran

References

Further reading
Abrahamian, Ervand (1982). Iran Between Two Revolutions. Princeton University Press.

External links
Donahue, Casey (2020) Profiles: Iranian Opposition Groups. The Iran Primer. United States Institute for Peace.

Political parties
Political parties
Iran
Iran